= Coastline (song) =

Single by Steve Kroeger featuring Skye Holland
- Released: 6 February 2017
- Genre: EDM
- Length: 3:14
- Label: Tough Stuff!; Sony Music
- Songwriter(s): Steve Kroeger * Sophia Mock

"Coastline" is a song by producer Steve Kroeger and singer Skye Holland. It became their third collaboration to chart on the Dance/Mix Show Airplay chart. A remixes EP was released on 7 April 2017, featuring remixes from Rick Ellback & Van Dutch and Tale & Dutch.

== Track listing ==
Digital download
No.	Title	Length
1.	"Coastline" (featuring Skye Holland)	3:14

Remixes EP
No.	Title	Length
1.	"Coastline" (Rick Ellback & Van Dutch Remix)	3:04
2.	"Coastline" (Tale & Dutch Remix)	3:40
3.	"Coastline" (Chill Mix)	3:32

== Charts ==
Chart (2017)	Peak position
US Dance/Mix Show Airplay (Billboard)	38
